Carroll Johnson (1851–1917) was a minstrel performer in the United States.
In 1892, he was touted as the merry Irish minstrel for his performance of The Gossoon by E. E. Kidder at Naylor's Opera House in Terre Haute.

He appears in blackface on the cover of the sheet music for "Ma Angeline". His performances popularized the song "Parson Johnson's Chicken Brigade". Sheet music for Carroll Johnson's Songs was published.

See also
Billy Birch

References

External links

 
 

1851 births
1917 deaths
Blackface minstrel performers